Bellvale may refer to: 
Bellvale, California, unincorporated community in San Mateo County, California
Bellvale, New York, wooded hamlet in Warwick, New York
Bellvale Mountain, mountain range near Bellvale, New York

See also 

 Bell Vale, Liverpool